Chahar Taq (also Romanized as Chahār Ţāq; also known as Chahar Tagh, Chahār Tak, and Chehārtak) is a village in Khorram Dasht Rural District, Kamareh District, Khomeyn County, Markazi Province, Iran. At the 2006 census, its population was 543, in 145 families.

References 

Populated places in Khomeyn County